This article provides details of international football games played by the Tajikistan national football team from 2020 to present.

Results

2020

2021

2022

Forthcoming fixtures
The following matches are scheduled:

2023

References

results 2020
2020s in Tajikistani sport